Geom may refer to:

 Geom, a Korean sword
 GEOM, a modular disk framework used in FreeBSD 5.0 and newer
 An abbreviation of geometry
 The God-Emperor of Mankind, a core character in the Warhammer 40,000 fictional universe